Big Brother Titans is the joint South African and Nigerian edition of the Big Brother franchise. The theme is "Ziyakhala Wahala". The series follows contestants as they live in an isolated house and compete for a cash prize at the end of the show by avoiding being evicted from the house by the viewers who vote on their favourite housemates to stay on the show. The show features housemates from South Africa and Nigeria.

The show premiered on 15 January 2023 on DStv channel 198 and GOtv channel 29.

Ebuka Obi-Uchendu and Lawrence Maleka are co-hosts of the show, and it is sponsored by Flutterwave, Bamboo and Lotto Star. According to the organizers of the show, MultiChoice, the winner of the season is expected to win a $100,000 (R1.7 million/₦46 million) cash prize.

A virtual audition was held to select contestants for the show from 6 to 22 October 2022. Interested contestants were told to record and submit a two-minute video stating why they should appear on the show.

Housemates 

On Day 0, 20 contestants entered the house, evenly split by country and gender. On Day 4, four more contestants entered the house. Housemates were later put into pairs until Week 7. Each pair would have a male and a female and have both countries represented.

The launch night (15 January) is marked as Day 0. The day after is Day 1.

Pairs

Nominations table

Notes 
: All nominations for weeks 1 and 6 were fake.

: All nominations starting from week 2 were for housemate pairs by pairs.

: In week 7, Tsatsii disobeyed Big Brother's rules by discussing nominations with other housemates other than her partner. As punishment, Big Brother revoked the Royals' Head of House immunity and placed them up for eviction.

: In week 8, Big Brother announced that the pairs had been dissolved and all housemates would go back to competing as individuals until the finale. Ipeleng won the Super Veto Power Holder, guaranteeing her a spot in the finale, Head of House for the week, and the power to choose a housemate to take to the finale.

: In week 9, there was no save and replace due to the Super Veto Power won by Ipeleng in week 8. She chose to take Ebubu to the finale.

References 

Reality television series franchises
Big Brother (franchise) adaptations